Seven ships of the Royal Navy have been named HMS Invincible.

  was originally the French 74-gun ship of the line L'Invincible, captured off Cape Finisterre in 1747. She was the first purpose-built 74-gun ship of the line to serve in the Royal Navy. The ship sank in February 1758 when she hit a sandbank in the East Solent.
  was a 74-gun third rate launched in 1765 at Deptford Dockyard and commissioned at Portsmouth in 1776. Her career saw her involvement in the Battle of Cape St. Vincent (1780) (against the Spanish fleet) and the Battle of St. Kitts and the Glorious First of June (both against the French fleet). She was also involved in the capture of St. Lucia, Trinidad and Surinam. She was wrecked off the Norfolk coast in 1801, with the loss of 400 lives.
  was a 74-gun ship, launched at Woolwich in 1808. She saw action in the Peninsular War, supporting the British forces. She was paid off in 1814, and broken up in 1861, in Plymouth.
  was an armoured "broadside battleship" built in 1869. She was renamed Erebus in 1904 and Fisgard II in 1906, before foundering in a storm in 1914.
  was a battlecruiser of the First World War attached to the 1st Cruiser Squadron, Home Fleet at the end of 1908. Only six crew members survived.
She served from 1980 to 2005, including service in the Falklands War. She was scrapped in Turkey in 2011.

Battle honours
 St Vincent, 1780 
 St Kitts, 1782 
 Glorious First of June, 1794 
 Alexandria, 1882
 Heligoland, 1914 
 Falkland Islands, 1914 
 Jutland, 1916 
 Falkland Islands, 1982

In fiction
 HMS Invincible, an aircraft carrier in the 1941 film Ships with Wings, portrayed by

See also
 
 Invincible class
 
 List of French privateers named for Napoleon Bonaparte

References

Royal Navy ship names